Irshad Kamil (born 5 September 1971) is an Indian poet and lyricist. His songs appear in Bollywood films including Jab We Met, Chameli, Love Aaj Kal,  Rockstar, Aashiqui 2, Raanjhanaa, Highway, Tamasha, and Jab Harry Met Sejal.

Personal life 
Kamil was born as the seventh child to his parents in Malerkotla, and belongs to a Punjabi Muslim family. He studied journalism at the Panjab University, followed by postgraduate and PhD degrees in Hindi.

Filmography

Awards and nominations

References 

 http://movies.rediff.com/report/2009/nov/09/meet-lyricist-irshad-kamil.htm

External links 
 Irshad Kamil's official website
 Irshad Kamil's All Lyrics

Living people
Filmfare Awards winners
Hindi-language writers
Hindi-language lyricists
Indian male songwriters
People from Sangrur
Punjabi people
Hindi-language poets
1971 births
Musicians from Punjab, India
Indian lyricists
Urdu-language poets from India
Indian Muslims